Novotsaritsynsky is a rural locality (a khutor) in Verkhnecherenskoye Rural Settlement, Kletsky District, Volgograd Oblast, Russia. The population was 337 as of 2010. There are 13 streets.

Geography 
Novotsaritsynsky is located 44 km southwest of Kletskaya (the district's administrative centre) by road. Verkhnecherensky is the nearest rural locality.

References 

Rural localities in Kletsky District